Makaturing, is a stratovolcano on Mindanao island in the Philippines. It is found in the province of Lanao del Sur (particularly in the town of Butig) in the Bangsamoro Autonomous Region in Muslim Mindanao. It is part of a string of volcanoes called the Central Mindanao Arc.

The Smithsonian Institution's Global Volcanology Program, citing the Catalog of Active Volcanoes of the World (Neumann van Padang, 1953), suggests that some eruptions were actually those of neighboring Ragang volcano.

Makaturing is one of the active volcanoes in the Philippines. All are part of the Pacific Ring of Fire.

Historical events
On May 18, 1947, Philippine Air Force (PAF) commander Gen. Edwin Andrews died with 16 others when the C-47 transport plane carrying them crashed in Makaturing. Nine years later, the PAF established an air base in Zamboanga City and is now named the Edwin Andrews Air Base from where the Philippine military launches air support operations in the ongoing campaign against separatists.

See also
 List of active volcanoes in the Philippines
 List of inactive volcanoes in the Philippines
 List of potentially active volcanoes in the Philippines
 Philippine Institute of Volcanology and Seismology

References

External links
 Philippine Institute of Volcanology and Seismology (PHIVOLCS) Makaturing Volcano Page (archived)
 

Stratovolcanoes of the Philippines
Subduction volcanoes
Volcanoes of Mindanao
Mountains of the Philippines
Landforms of Lanao del Sur
Active volcanoes of the Philippines